Gould Island is located off the Great Southern region of Western Australia.

References

Islands of the Great Southern (Western Australia)